Modrica may refer to:

 Modriča, a town and municipality in Bosnia and Herzegovina
 Modrica (Kruševac), a small village in Serbia